Sigharting is a municipality in the district of Schärding in the Austrian state of Upper Austria.

Geography
Sigharting lies in the northern Innviertel. About 12 percent of the municipality is forest, and 77 percent is farmland.

References

Cities and towns in Schärding District